Mania (1984) is Menudo's 15th album and their first one in Portuguese featuring Ricky Meléndez, Charlie Massó, Ray Reyes, Roy Rosselló, and Robby Rosa.  The songs on this album are a selection from the group's previous four Spanish albums translated into Portuguese. This is the last album that Ricky Meléndez recorded as a member of the group. The album made success in Brazil, selling over 1 million copies there.

Track listing
 "Não Se Reprima" - Singer: Charlie Massó
 "Quero Ser" - Singer: Ray Reyes
 "Rock Na TV" - Singer: Robby Rosa
 "Suba Em Minha Moto" - Singer: Ricky Melendez
 "Tudo Vai Bem" - Singer: Charlie Massó
 "Doces Beijos" - Singer: Robby Rosa
 "Indianópolis" - Singer: Charlie Massó
 "Se Tu Não Estás" - Singer: Robby Rosa
 "Troque Suas Pilhas" - Singer: Ricky Meléndez
 "Quero Rock" - Singer: Robby Rosa

References

1984 albums
Menudo (band) albums